The Landesmuseum Württemberg (Württemberg State Museum) is the main historical museum of the Württemberg part of the German state of Baden-Württemberg. It emerged from the 16th-century “Kunstkammer” (Cabinet of art and curiosities) of the dukes, later kings, of Württemberg who resided in Stuttgart. As a museum it was founded in 1862 by King William I.

Collections in Stuttgart and Waldenbuch  
The museum's main location is the Old Castle in Stuttgart. The nearby granary and the cellar of the New Castle also contain parts of the collections as well as Waldenbuch Castle outside of Stuttgart.

The collections are grouped into eight divisions:

 Schausammlung LegendäreMeisterWerke (Legendary Masterpieces)
 archeology: Paleolithic, Neolithic, Bronze Age, Iron Age, antiquity, Romans in Württemberg, early Middle Ages
 history of art and cultural history: Württemberg crown jewels, medieval art, modern glass painting
 Schausammlung Wahre Schätze (Real Treasures)
 Antikensammlung - Museum of Ancient Art
 Kunstkammer - Cabinet of Art and Curiosities
 Kelten - Early Celtic Treasures
 Glass collection of Ernesto Wolf
 antique glass
 modern era glass
 Clocks and scientific instruments
 Kindermuseum Junges Schloss - Museum for Children
 Musical instruments (located in the Fruchtkasten (granary))
 Roman lapidarium (located in the cellar of Neues Schloss (New Castle))
 Folklore (located at the Museum of Everyday Culture in Waldenbuch Castle outside of Stuttgart): labor, belief and piety, graphic design, clothing, merchandise, culture of living.

Apart from these collections the museum regularly features special exhibitions.

The museum presents a whole range of archeological treasures and a notable collection of medieval art. It also includes the inventories of the former army and manufacturing museums. Some of the most valuable possessions of the museum were already acquired by the dukes for their art chamber: two of only four preserved Aztec feather shields from before 1521 and the oldest preserved card game, about 1430, richly decorated and expensive already at the time of production. Exhibits of local origin include a celestial globe of 1493 by Johannes Stöffler, an 11-digit mechanical calculator of 1774 by Philipp Matthäus Hahn (the first to build functional calculators to Gottfried Leibniz' design for all four arithmetic operations), and, probably the museum's most symbolic exhibit despite being similar to other ones: the royal Württemberg crown of 1797.

Further Collections 

The museum today has a further seven branches throughout Württemberg referring to special topics:
 Schlossmuseum Aulendorf (Aulendorf Castle museum): old toys and art of the classicism period
 Schloss Urach (Urach Castle): sleighs of state, 25 specimens, world's biggest collection of this kind
 Museum für Kutschen, Chaisen, Karren (museum for carriages, chaises, carts), Hellenstein Castle, Heidenheim
 German Playing Card Museum (Deutsches Spielkartenmuseum), Leinfelden-Echterdingen: 15,000 card decks and 500,000 cards from seven centuries. The biggest public collection of playing cards in Europe
 Fashion museum, Ludwigsburg Palace
 Ceramics museum and Ludwigsburg porcelain, Ludwigsburg Palace
 Dominican museum, Rottweil: archeological collection on arae flaviae (Rottweil), oldest town (AD 73)in Baden-Württemberg; medieval religious art collection; contemporary art collection of the Rottweil area

Several other former branches now belong to the separate Baden-Württemberg State Archeological Museum (Archäologisches Landesmuseum Baden-Württemberg), which has been founded in 1990 due to the ever increasing findings of archeological heritage in the state.

Selected exhibits of Landesmuseum Württemberg

External links
Official web site (Select Language menu at top)
Museum of Everyday Culture (German)
Playing Card Museum (German)

Museums in Stuttgart
History museums in Germany
1862 establishments in Germany
Museums established in 1862
19th-century establishments in Württemberg
National museums of Germany